Dondo is a Celebic language of Sulawesi in Indonesia. It is not clear how distinct it is from Tomini. It is spoken along the western coast of the "neck" of Sulawesi.

References

Tomini–Tolitoli languages
Languages of Sulawesi